Thomas Clarion (born 15 March 1982) is a French male visually impaired cross-country skier and biathlete who is also well known as a physiotherapist. He has competed at the Winter Paralympics in 2010, 2014 and 2018.

Career 
Thomas Clarion competed in his first Paralympic event in 2010 and went medalless during the competition. He claimed 2 bronze medals at the 2014 Winter Paralympics in the men's 10km cross-country skiing event and 4 x 2.5 km relay open event.

He went onto represent France at the 2018 Winter Paralympics, his third Paralympic event and managed to claim a bronze medal in the men's 20km free visually impaired cross-country skiing event which was also his third Paralympic medal. He claimed his first Paralympic gold medal during the 2018 Winter Paralympics after winning the men's 4 x 2.5 km relay open team event for France along with other members including Benjamin Daviet and Anthony Chalençon.

References

External links 
 
 

1982 births
Living people
French male biathletes
French male cross-country skiers
Cross-country skiers at the 2010 Winter Paralympics
Cross-country skiers at the 2014 Winter Paralympics
Cross-country skiers at the 2018 Winter Paralympics
Biathletes at the 2010 Winter Paralympics
Biathletes at the 2014 Winter Paralympics
Biathletes at the 2018 Winter Paralympics
Paralympic biathletes of France
Paralympic cross-country skiers of France
Paralympic gold medalists for France
Paralympic bronze medalists for France
Medalists at the 2014 Winter Paralympics
Medalists at the 2018 Winter Paralympics
French physiotherapists
Visually impaired category Paralympic competitors
French blind people
Paralympic medalists in cross-country skiing
21st-century French people